ddPCR may refer to:
Droplet Digital PCR, a form of digital polymerase chain reaction
Differential display PCR